The Anti-Lebanon Mountains (Lebanese Arabic: , , "Eastern Mountains") are a southwest–northeast-trending mountain range that forms most of the border between Syria and Lebanon. The border is largely defined along the crest of the range. Most of the range lies in Syria.

Etymology
Its Western name Anti-Lebanon comes from the Greek and Latin , derived from its position opposite and parallel to the Mount Lebanon range.

Geology
To the south, the range adjoins the lower-lying Golan Heights plateau, but includes the highest peaks, namely Mount Hermon (Jabal el-Shaykh, in Arabic), at 2,814 metres, and Ta'la't Musa, at 2,669 metres. These peaks, on the Lebanese-Syrian border, are snow-covered for much of the year.

Anti-Lebanon mountains are an anticline. Their predominant rocks are limestone and chalk from the Jurassic period.

Geography
To the north, they extend to almost the latitude of the Syrian city of Homs. The mountains end in the south with Mount Hermon, which borders on the Golan Heights; the Golan Heights are a different geological and geomorphological entity, but geopolitically they are often regarded together with the southern slopes of Mount Hermon, both being part of the Israeli-occupied Golan region. To the west of the Anti-Lebanon lie valleys that separate it from Mount Lebanon in central Lebanon: Beqaa Valley in the north and the Hasbani River valley in the south. To the east, in Syria, lies the Eastern Plateau, location of the city of Damascus.

The mountains provide a rain shadow to the region on their east, such as Beqaa Valley and even the Syrian Desert, which fall on the leeward side of the mountains.

An important smuggling route between Lebanon and Syria passes through the Anti-Lebanon Mountains.

Ecology
The area is known for its apricot and cherry trees as well as its stone quarries. In the mountains, amygdalus and pistachio bushes thrive. On the west side small-scale deciduous forests and isolated dry coniferous forests with Cilician firs (Abies cilicica), Lebanon cedars (Cedrus libani) and Greek juniper (Juniperus excelsa). Subalpine and alpine plant communities occur over 2500 metres. The grazing by sheep and goats, has led to an increased erosion of the remaining forests and to a substantial deterioration of soil and vegetation. The predominant form of economy is extensive nomadic grazing.

There are various endemic flora found and named after the region (having a specific epithet that means "of the Anti-Lebanon"). These include Euphorbia antilibanotica, Teucrium antilibanoticum, Valerianella antilibanotica, and Iris antilibanotica.

See also
Song of Songs 4

References

Mountain ranges of Lebanon
Mountain ranges of Syria
Lebanon–Syria border